Jose Alberto Torres Abreu (born June 17, 1980 in Chicago), known professionally as Yomo, is an American reggaeton singer of Puerto Rican descent. He was raised in Humacao. Before becoming a professional artist, he used to work as a handyman on Puerto Rico's Palmas Del Mar Beach Resort.

Discography

Albums
2008: My Destiny

References

1980 births
Living people
American musicians of Puerto Rican descent
American reggaeton musicians
Sony Music Latin artists